The Mocoví language is a Guaicuruan language of Argentina spoken by about 3,000 people, mostly in Santa Fe, Chaco, and Formosa provinces.

In 2010, the province of Chaco in Argentina declared Mocoví as one of four provincial official languages alongside Spanish and the indigenous Qom and Wichí.

The Mataco-Guicurú language family is a group of 11 indigenous languages of the Americas spoken in Argentina, Bolivia, Brazil and Paraguay, comprising two subfamilies with a total of approximately 100,000 speakers distributed in the Bermejo, Pilcomayo and Paraguay river basins. Other languages of the family are extinct and some others are threatened with extinction.

In the province of Santa Fe, it is used mostly by the elderly Mocoví population. Among adults, bilingualism is widespread and among young people Spanish is preferred. In the province of Chaco, the Mocoví language and culture are carefully preserved.

Writing in the Mocoví language was non-existent until the 1950s, when a group of missionaries developed a Latin alphabet writing system for the Toba language, which was later adapted to Mocoví for the translation of the Bible by Alberto Buckwater. This writing system is still based on correspondence with Spanish orthography, so it contains some of its irregularities.

Phonology

Consonants 
The following are the consonants of Mocoví:

Vowels 
Gualdieri (1998) gives the following vowels:

Notes

References

External links
https://web.archive.org/web/20041211212213/http://www.mpi.nl/DOBES/INFOpages/Posters/Argentina/Argentina.pdf
 Mocoví Indians - The Catholic Encyclopedia
 Argentinian Languages Collection of Salvador Bucca at the Archive of the Indigenous Languages of Latin America, including audio recordings of stories and word lists in Mocoví.
 Mocoví (Intercontinental Dictionary Series)
 http://mocovilanguage.weebly.com/people-and-culture.html
 https://ri.conicet.gov.ar/handle/11336/13436
 http://www.scielo.edu.uy/scielo.php?script=sci_arttext&pid=S2079-312X2015000200002
 https://dialnet.unirioja.es/servlet/articulo?codigo=5033346
 http://ffyl1.uncu.edu.ar/IMG/pdf/Censabella_y_Messineo_eds_2013.pdf#page=39

Guaicuruan languages
Endangered Guaicuruan languages
Languages of Argentina
Chaco linguistic area

Santa Fe, Argentina
Formosa, Argentina